Nebria saeviens is a species of ground beetle in the Nebriinae subfamily that is endemic to Japan.

References

saeviens
Beetles described in 1883
Beetles of Asia
Endemic fauna of Japan